The Trou du Diable (translated in English as Devil's Hole) is a cave situated in St-Casimir, in the province of Quebec, Canada.

The Trou du Diable is in fact a creek of which the last 980 meters are underground, which makes it the second longest in Quebec. It is tributary of the Rivière Ste-Anne, about four kilometers upstream of St-Casimir. 

Its highest point is 6.8 metres above the bottom of the cave, and at some places visitors have to crawl to move forward.

External links 
Description and images from Nichole Ouellette
Tourist website about the trou du Diable
Bougex Website about speleology
Société québécoise de spéléologie

Caves of Quebec